Woodbury is a city in Washington County, Minnesota, United States, eight miles (13 km) east of Saint Paul along Interstate 94. It is part of the Minneapolis–Saint Paul metropolitan area. The population was 75,102 at the 2020 census, making it Minnesota's eighth most populous city.

History

At almost 36 square miles, Woodbury is a direct descendant of one of the congressional townships into which Minnesota Territory when the Native Americans of the United States ceded the territory and opened it to "settlement". Woodbury was originally named Red Rock, but was renamed after Levi Woodbury, the first justice of the Supreme Court of the United States to attend law school, after it was realized that another Red Rock Township existed in Minnesota. When first settled in 1844, the land was mostly wood, but it was converted to farmland. The township government was organized in 1858. One of the city's few surviving 19th-century farms, the Charles Spangenberg Farmstead, is on the National Register of Historic Places.

In 1955, the first suburban development broke ground in Woodbury: Woodbury Heights. After some years of growth, the town government could not adequately provide services for new developments, and it became clear that Woodbury needed the government of a village with extra privileges. The earliest proposal for incorporation officially came in 1963 after two years of debate.

The Minnesota Municipal Commission had recently found that the fragmented way in which the Minneapolis suburbs and the suburbs around White Bear Lake had developed was disadvantageous, as it made coordinating sewers, public water systems, and other utilities difficult. Thus, the Commission had been encouraging towns to incorporate in full whenever possible.

Since 1961, the Town of Cottage Grove had been petitioning to become a village, and the Minnesota Municipal Commission took it upon itself to push for a joint incorporation of Woodbury and Cottage Grove as the Village of Washington. The two town commissions agreed to the idea, and the issue was put up for a vote during the general election of 1963. It lost with 662 votes for joint incorporation, and 1,284 against. Cottage Grove incorporated on its own in 1965.

In 1966, a series of meetings took place setting up the incorporation of the Village of Woodbury. A vote was conducted on February 14, 1967, with 543 voting for incorporation, and 164 against. The Village was officially incorporated on March 7, 1967.

Geography

The city is bounded on the northern side by Interstate 94, the south by the plane of 60th Street South, the west by Century Avenue, and the east by Manning Avenue. The adjoining cities in these directions are, respectively, Oakdale, Landfall, Lake Elmo, Cottage Grove, Maplewood, Newport and Afton.

Woodbury is composed of upland between the valleys of the Mississippi River and St. Croix River. Its northeast corner lies within the watershed of Valley Creek, one of the few remaining trout streams in the Twin Cities area. Valley Creek flows eastward to the St. Croix River at Afton. Woodbury also contains several small lakes, including Powers, Wilmes, Colby, Carver, and Battle Creek. Battle Creek Lake is the source of Battle Creek, which flows westward to the Mississippi River in Saint Paul.

Climate

Demographics

2010 census
As of the census of 2010, there were 61,961 people, 22,594 households, and 16,688 families living in the city. The racial makeup of the city was 81.4% White, 5.6% African American, 0.3% Native American, 9.1% Asian, 1.0% from other races, and 2.5% from two or more races. Hispanic or Latino of any race were 3.8% of the population.

There were 22,594 households, of which 42.3% had children under the age of 18 living with them, 61.8% were married couples living together, 8.7% had a female householder with no husband present, 3.3% had a male householder with no wife present, and 26.1% were non-families. 20.4% of all households were made up of individuals, and 5.7% had someone living alone who was 65 years of age or older. The average household size was 2.73 and the average family size was 3.20.

The median age in the city was 35.6 years. 29.6% of residents were under the age of 18; 6.2% were between the ages of 18 and 24; 29.6% were from 25 to 44; 26.3% were from 45 to 64; and 8.3% were 65 years of age or older. The gender makeup of the city was 48.2% male and 51.8% female.

2000 census
As of the census of 2000, there were 46,463 people, 16,676 households, and 12,657 families living in the city. The racial makeup of the city was 90.04% White, 2.51% African American, 0.24% Native American, 5.01% Asian, 0.01% Pacific Islander, 0.62% from other races, and 1.56% from two or more races. Hispanic or Latino of any race were 2.14% of the population.

There were 16,676 households, out of which 43.8% had children under the age of 18 living with them, 66.8% were married couples living together, 6.9% had a female householder with no husband present, and 24.1% were non-families. 18.8% of all households were made up of individuals, and 3.3% had someone living alone who was 65 years of age or older.  The average household size was 2.76 and the average family size was 3.20.

In the city, the population was spread out, with 30.6% under the age of 18, 5.9% from 18 to 24, 36.9% from 25 to 44, 20.5% from 45 to 64, and 6.1% who were 65 years of age or older.  The median age was 33 years. For every 100 females, there were 94.1 males.  For every 100 females age 18 and over, there were 91.4 males.

The median income for a household in the city was $76,109, and the median income for a family was $84,997. Males had a median income of $60,224 versus $37,676 for females. The per capita income for the city was $32,606.  About 0.8% of families and 1.7% of the population were below the poverty line, including 1.2% of those under age 18 and 1.2% of those age 65 or over.

Economy
State Farm Insurance was a large-scale employer in the city, employing about 2,000 people in a building that opened in 1994. In 2006 the multi-department facility was relocated to Lincoln, Nebraska, and the building remained vacant until it was demolished in 2015 for redevelopment. There are many smaller employers, such as the Joint Commission on Allied Health Personnel in Ophthalmology and offices for financial corporations. Many Woodbury residents work at 3M, whose headquarters are a few miles west, in Maplewood.

A large part of the economy is retail. The two largest retail centers are Tamarack Village, near the intersection of Radio Drive and Interstate 94, and Woodbury Village, near the intersection of Valley Creek Road and Interstate 494. Woodbury Lakes, an upscale retail development with an open-air mall layout, was completed in 2005.

Largest employers
According to the city's 2015 Community Development Annual Report:

Other important employers include eFunds, Long Term Care Group and Dean Foods/Land O'Lakes.

Arts and culture
During the last weekend of August, the Woodbury Days Council hosts an event called Woodbury Days. Some cities  that have a community event have "royalty" associated with it. Woodbury Days' royalty are known as the Woodbury Ambassadors Royal Family.

Parks and recreation

The trails, most of which are paved, connect many of the parks. Three of the largest parks encircle Colby, Wilmes, and Powers lakes, respectively. The indoor Central Park is adjacent to the public library. HealthEast Sports Center is the primary athletic location, including softball fields, baseball fields, soccer fields, football fields, sand volleyball courts, two indoor ice arenas, and an outdoor ice arena.

Two golf courses are in the city: Prestwick (privately owned) and Eagle Valley (public). There are many local events year-round. Woodbury Days is held in Ojibway Park each year. It includes a parade, carnival, live music, fireworks, and many booths for the city's shops, churches, and services. Woodbury Days is also known for its Taste of Woodbury tent in the parking lot behind Woodbury High School and overlooking the Ojibway Park Band Shell. This tent includes many restaurants in the city. There is also an outdoor pool available by membership in the summer called Colby lake pool.

Government
Woodbury has a weak-mayor, mayor-council government. In presidential election years, Woodbury elects two city council members at large. In midterm election years, it elects a mayor and two city council members at large. As the city's population has grown, Woodbury has shifted toward the Democratic and Democratic-Farmer-Labor parties, with the city not voting for a Republican in a presidential election since 2004. 
 
The city council is currently composed of Mayor Anne Burt, Andrea Date, Steve Morris, Jennifer Santini, and Kim Wilson.

Education
Most of Woodbury is in the South Washington County School District, and most high school students attend either Woodbury High School or East Ridge High School. Small portions of the city attend Tartan Senior High School in Oakdale and Stillwater Area High School in Stillwater. Some students attend public or private schools in other school districts chosen by their families under Minnesota's open enrollment statute.

In November 2006, School District 833 selected an  site for its third high school, later named East Ridge High School. The site lies between two city-owned properties south of Bailey Road and east of Radio Drive: the  HealthEast Sports Center and the Danner gravel pit. The school opened in September 2009. Its students came from Woodbury, Cottage Grove, Newport, Afton, and Denmark.

There are two middle schools in Woodbury, Lake Middle School and Woodbury Middle School. Some middle-school students also attend Oltman Middle School in Cottage Grove, Skyview Middle School in Oakdale, Maplewood Middle School in Maplewood, and Oak-Land Middle School in Lake Elmo. Woodbury is also served by 12 elementary schools in three school districts.

Woodbury is also home to the Minnesota Math and Science Academy, a charter school. Saint Ambrose of Woodbury is a Catholic school with Pre-K through 8th grade; New Life Academy is a private Christian school. Both are within the city limits.

Rasmussen College–Lake Elmo / Woodbury campus serves students in the Woodbury area. Rasmussen College is a regionally accredited, career focused college that offers bachelor and associate degree programs. It concentrates on programs in health sciences, nursing, business, technology and design, criminal justice, and early education.

Notable people

Kelly Fenton, former Minnesota State Representative and former Minnesota Republican Party deputy chairperson
Michelle Fischbach, United States Representative from Minnesota's Seventh Congressional District
Susan Kent, Minnesota State Senate minority leader
Jason Lewis, former United States Representative From Minnesota's Second Congressional District
Nicole Mitchell, meteorologist and politician
Walt Perlt, Minnesota state representative
Mary Giuliani Stephens, former mayor
Michelle Young, star of season 18 of The Bachelorette, raised in Woodbury

References

External links

 City website
Woodbury Area Chamber of Commerce

Cities in Washington County, Minnesota
Cities in Minnesota
1967 establishments in Minnesota